Dogweed is a common name for several plants formerly included in the genus Dyssodia. Plants referred to as dogweed include species in the genera:

Adenophyllum
Thymophylla, especially:
Thymophylla pentachaeta, native to the United States and Mexico